Naangal is a 1992 Indian Tamil-language drama film directed by Hassan. The film stars Sivaji Ganesan, Prabhu and Deepika Chikhalia. It was released on 20 March 1992.

Plot

Keerthi, an honest police officer, is charged to solve a double murder case. Keerthi faces up to another police officer Naveen Kumar. Naveen Kumar who hungers for a promotion wants to take charge of this affair. Keerthi and Naveen Kumar finally fight, and the matter is taken up in court. Keerthi hires the lawyer Chaturvedi, a senior lawyer who has never lost a case. Later, Chaturvedi has a heart attack and the doctor Mona takes care of him. He really likes the way she took care of him and he now considered her like his own daughter. The doctors Rajasekhar and Mona suspect the hospital running by the doctor Johnson for doing illegal activities. Rajasekhar is later killed by someone, the presumed guilty is Mona according to the fingerprint on the murder weapon. Keerthi and Chaturvedi come to her rescue.

Cast

Prabhu as Keerthi
Sivaji Ganesan as Chaturvedi
Janagaraj as Sundaram
Deepika Chikhalia as Mona
Srividya as Lakshmi
Sarath Babu as Rajasekhar
Nassar as Johnson
Captain Raju as Naveen Kumar
Rajan P. Dev as Rathnaswamy
Mohan Raj as Maruthi
Kumarimuthu
Neelu
Sivaraman as Senthamizh Nithyanandam
Sachu
Sharmili
Manjupriya
Aasha
Rajeshwari
Ponnambalam
Sangita as Gayathri

Soundtrack
The music was composed by Ilaiyaraaja, with lyrics written by Vaali and Gangai Amaran.

Reception
N. Krishnaswamy of The Indian Express said "As the film's script is free from some of the cliches that constantly besiege Tamil films, Naangal is not without its merits as 'time passing' fare".

References

External links

1990s Tamil-language films
1992 films
Films scored by Ilaiyaraaja